The year 2013 in Archosaur paleontology was eventful.  Archosaurs include the only living dinosaur group — birds — and the reptile crocodilians, plus all extinct dinosaurs,  extinct crocodilian relatives, and pterosaurs. Archosaur palaeontology is the scientific study of those animals, especially as they existed before the Holocene Epoch began about 11,700 years ago.  The year 2013 in paleontology included various significant developments regarding archosaurs.

This article records new taxa of fossil archosaurs of every kind that have been described during the year 2013, as well as other significant discoveries and events related to paleontology of archosaurs that occurred in the year 2013.

Pseudosuchians

Research
 Mesoeucrocodylian fossils, which might be the first recorded Cenozoic fossils of atoposaurids, are described from the Eocene Kaninah Formation of Yemen by Stevens et al. (2013).

New taxa

Newly named basal dinosauromorphs

Non-avian dinosaurs

Research
 A study on the reproductive strategies of dinosaurs is published by Werner & Griebeler (2013).
 A re-analysis of prior studies on the dinosaur growth rates is published by Myhrvold (2013).
 A study on an assemblage of specimens of Aniksosaurus darwini from the Upper Cretaceous Bajo Barreal Formation (Argentina) evaluating whether the assemblage is truly monospecific and whether or not all the individuals died at the same time based on taphonomic data, is published by Ibiricu et al. (2013).
 Redescription of Lusotitan atalaiensis and a study on the phylogenetic relationships of basal titanosauriform sauropods is published by Mannion et al. (2013).
 A review of all fossil specimens referred to Euoplocephalus tutus, as well as specimens that were previously referred to Euoplocephalus but subsequently were assigned to different genera, is published by Arbour & Currie (2013).

New taxa

Birds

Research
 Eleutherornis is re-examined and classified as a member of Phorusrhacidae by Angst et al. (2013).

New taxa

Newly named pterosaurs

References

2010s in paleontology
Paleontology
2013 in paleontology